3996 Fugaku, provisional designation , is a stony Florian asteroid from the inner regions of the asteroid belt, approximately 5.5 kilometers in diameter. It was discovered on 5 December 1988, by Japanese amateur astronomers Masaru Arai and Hiroshi Mori at Yorii Observatory in central Japan. It was named for Mount Fuji, Japan.

Orbit and classification 

Fugaku is a member of the Flora family, one of the largest groups of stony asteroids in the main-belt. It orbits the Sun in the inner main-belt at a distance of 2.0–2.5 AU once every 3 years and 5 months (1,241 days). Its orbit has an eccentricity of 0.10 and an inclination of 2° with respect to the ecliptic.

Physical characteristics 

Fugaku has been characterized as a stony S-type asteroid, the most common type in the inner main-belt.

Rotation period 

In March 210, a rotational lightcurve of Fugaku was obtained from photometric observations at the Palomar Transient Factory in California. It gave a rotation period of 7.1912 hours with a change in brightness of 0.86 magnitude.

Diameter and albedo 

According to the survey carried out by NASA's Wide-field Infrared Survey Explorer with its subsequent NEOWISE mission, Fugaku measures between 5.15 and 5.88 kilometers in diameter, and its surface has an albedo between 0.34 and 0.42. The Collaborative Asteroid Lightcurve Link assumes an albedo of 0.24 – derived from 8 Flora, the largest member and namesake of this family – and calculates a diameter of 5.40 kilometers with an absolute magnitude of 13.5.

Naming 

This minor planet was named for the ancient name of Mount Fuji, Japan's highest mountain and a well-known symbol. Another minor planet, 1584 Fuji, is also named for this mountain. The official naming citation was published by the Minor Planet Center on 4 May 1999.

References

External links 
 Asteroid Lightcurve Database (LCDB), query form (info )
 Dictionary of Minor Planet Names, Google books
 Asteroids and comets rotation curves, CdR – Observatoire de Genève, Raoul Behrend
 Discovery Circumstances: Numbered Minor Planets (1)-(5000) – Minor Planet Center
 
 

003996
Discoveries by Masaru Arai
Discoveries by Hiroshi Mori (astronomer)
Named minor planets
19881205